Ali Pasha was the name of numerous Ottoman pashas named Ali. It is most commonly used to refer to Ali Pasha of Ioannina.

It may also refer to:

 Çandarlı Ali Pasha (died 1406), Ottoman grand vizier (1387–1406)
 Hadım Ali Pasha (died 1511), Ottoman grand vizier (1501–03, 1506–11)
 Sofu Hadım Ali Pasha (fl. 1537–1560), Ottoman governor of Diyarbekir, Bosnia and Egypt
 Semiz Ali Pasha (died 1565), Ottoman grand vizier (1561–1565)
 Müezzinzade Ali Pasha (died 1571), Ottoman governor of Egypt (1563–66) and commander in the Battle of Lepanto
 Uluç Ali Paşa (1519–1587), Ottoman Kapudan Pasha (admiral of the navy)
 Yavuz Ali Pasha (died 1604), Ottoman grand vizier (1603–04) and governor of Egypt (1601–03)
 Güzelce Ali Pasha (d. 1621), Ottoman grand vizier (1616–21)
 Sürmeli Ali Pasha (1645–1695), Ottoman grand vizier (1694–95)
 Çalık Ali Pasha (died 1698), Ottoman grand vizier (1692–93)
 Silahdar Damat Ali Pasha (1667–1716), Ottoman grand vizier (1713–16)
 Çorlulu Ali Pasha (1670–1711), Ottoman grand vizier (1706–1710)
 Abu l-Hasan Ali I (1688-1756), ruler of Tunisia 1735-1756
 Moralı Ali Pasha (died 1735), Ottoman governor of various provinces, including Egypt (1725–26)
 Ali Pasha of Ioannina or of Tepelena or of Janina/Yannina/Ioannina, or the Lion of Yannina (1740–1822), Ottoman Albanian ruler
 Ali Pasha Rizvanbegović (1783–1851), Ottoman governor of Herzegovina (1833–51)
 Trabluslu Ali Pasha (died 1804), Ottoman governor of Egypt (1803–04)
 Seydi Ali Pasha (died 1821), Ottoman Kapudan Pasha (admiral of the navy)
 Mehmed Emin Âli Pasha (1815–1871), Ottoman grand vizier (1852–71) and a leader of the Tanzimat reforms
 Ali Pasha of Gucia (1817–1889), Albanian military leader
 Ali Pasha (Mamluk ruler of Baghdad) (r. 1802–1807)

See also
 Muhammad Ali Pasha (1769–1849), Ottoman Albanian commander, one-time governor of Egypt and Sudan
 Ali Rıza Pasha (governor of Baghdad) (fl. 1831–1842), Ottoman military leader and governor of Baghdad
 Ali Rıza Pasha (1860–1932), Ottoman grand vizier (1919–20)
 Ali Pasha Mosque (disambiguation)